Wyoming Highway 130 (WYO 130) is a  state highway in the U.S. State of Wyoming. It is known locally as the Snowy Range Road. It makes its way west from Laramie across the plains, and rises over the Medicine Bow Mountains. The road then turns north through the town of Saratoga, and ends at Interstate 80 (I-80). The stretch of road over the mountains is a National Forest Byway. WYO 130 over Snowy Range Pass is closed during winter (November–May)

Route description 

Six miles east of Centennial, 130 intersects Wyoming Highway 11 which provides a route to Albany. From there Highway 130 travels  in a relatively due east direction over rolling hills. At  Wyoming Highway 12 is intersected, and at  Highway 130 meets Highway 230 once again just west of Laramie. From here the routes 130 and 230 run together (or concurrent) into Laramie as Snowy Range Road. This is the only instance in Wyoming where two state routes are merged. Shortly after, Snowy Range Road (WYO 130/WYO 230) has an interchange with I-80 (Exit 311). Almost  after that interchange Wyoming Highway 130, as well as Wyoming Highway 230, ends at I-80 BUS/US 30/US 287.

History 

Highway 130 used to begin in downtown Saratoga at the current unmarked junction with Wyoming Highway 74 (the corner of First and Bridge Streets). The current routing of Wyoming 130 from the Highway 74 junction south to the Highway 230 junction was once part of Wyoming Highway 70. Originally Highway 130 traveled southeast along the Carbon County Route 504 path to Ryan Park. The roadway from Ryan Park to the WYO 130/WYO 230 junction was not built at that time. Then 130 resumes its current course east to Centennial and Laramie.

Major intersections

See also

References

External links

Wyoming State Route 200-299
WYO 130 - I-80 Bus/US 30/US 287/WYO 230 to I-80/US 30/US 287 (see Wyoming 130)
Snowy Range Scenic Byway
Scenic Mountain Drives - Snowy Range Road

Transportation in Albany County, Wyoming
Transportation in Carbon County, Wyoming
130